The 2nd Nunavut Legislature lasted from 2004 to 2008. The government of premier Paul Okalik was sustained for a second term after the members of the Legislative Assembly of Nunavut re-elected him as premier.

The legislature began after the second general election on February 16, 2004 when 19 members were returned with six of those being incumbents.

Membership in the 2nd assembly

Members elected in the 2nd general election

Membership changes

References

External links
Legislative Assembly of Nunavut official website

2
Legislature, 2
Legislature, 2